Richard Langton Baker (May 14, 1870 – January 3, 1951) was a Canadian politician. Born in Strathroy, Ontario, Canada, Baker was elected to the House of Commons of Canada in 1925 as a Member of the historical Conservative Party in the riding of Toronto Northeast. He was defeated in the same riding in 1926, but, won again in 1930. He was elected in the riding of Eglinton in 1935 and defeated in 1940 as a member of the National Government coalition.

External links 
 

1870 births
1951 deaths
Conservative Party of Canada (1867–1942) MPs
Members of the House of Commons of Canada from Ontario